The octobass is an extremely large and rare bowed string instrument that was first built around 1850 in Paris by the French luthier Jean-Baptiste Vuillaume (1798–1875).

Usage
Because of the extreme fingerboard length and string thickness, the musician plays it using a system of levers and pedals. The levers serve to engage metal clamps that are positioned above the neck at specific positions. These clamps act as fretting devices when the performer presses the levers. It has never been produced on a large scale or used much by composers (though Hector Berlioz wrote favorably about the instrument and proposed its widespread adoption).

The only known work from the 19th century that specifically calls for the octobass is Charles Gounod's . In this work, the octobass only appears in the "Benedictus" and the "Agnus Dei" and is specified to be tuned B, E, and B. It typically plays one octave below the double bass.

In addition to the Paris instrument, octobasses exist in the collections of the Musical Instrument Museum in Phoenix, Arizona, and the Kunsthistorisches Museum in Vienna. In October 2016, the Quebec company Canimex donated an octobass to the Montreal Symphony Orchestra, which is now the only orchestra in the world to own one. This instrument was made by the luthier Jean-Jacques Pagès of Mirecourt, France, in 2010.

Range and tuning
According to Berlioz, the three open strings were tuned C, G, and C. This tuning gave it a low range one octave below the cello and equal to the modern double bass with low C extension. However, at the time when the octobass was invented, the double bass lacked this extension and could descend only to E or G. The mechanism enabled each string to chromatically cover the range of a perfect fifth and gave the instrument a high range to G. The instrument at the Musée de la Musique in Paris, which uses period-accurate gut strings, is tuned thus (though on at least some recordings the overall tuning is a half-step flat).

The instrument at the Musical Instrument Museum in Phoenix, which uses modern wound metal strings, is tuned C, G, D. This tuning gives it a low range two octaves below the cello and one octave below the modern double bass with low C extension. Berlioz specifically noted this tuning in his orchestration treatise, but considered it erroneous. As on the Paris instrument, the mechanism allows each string to cover a perfect fifth, giving it a high range to A. The fundamental frequencies of the lowest notes in this tuning lie below 20 Hz—the commonly-stated lower bound of human hearing range—but these notes are nevertheless audible due to the overtones they produce. (An organ's 32′ stop also exceeds the supposed 20 Hz limit.)

The Montreal Symphony Orchestra octobass uses gut strings, is tuned A, E, B and has a high range to F.

See also
 Triple contrabass viol

References

External links
 Octobass on Atlas Obscura
 Octobass on the OSM website 

Violin family instruments
Contrabass instruments
1850 introductions